Carex dolichostachya is a species of flowering plant in the sedge genus Carex, family Cyperaceae. It is native to eastern Asia; central and southeast China, Taiwan, the Philippines, Korea, the Ryukyu Islands, and Japan. Its popular cultivar 'Kaga-nishiki' is sold in the US by the trade designation .

Subtaxa
The following subtaxa are accepted:
Carex dolichostachya subsp. dolichostachya
Carex dolichostachya f. imbecillis (Ohwi) T.Koyama – Kyushu, Japan
Carex dolichostachya subsp. trichosperma (Ohwi) T.Koyama – Alishan Range, Taiwan

References

dolichostachya
Flora of North-Central China
Flora of South-Central China
Flora of Southeast China
Flora of Eastern Asia
Flora of the Philippines
Plants described in 1921